Anel Hebibović (born 7 July 1990) is a Bosnian professional footballer who plays as a winger for Bosnian Premier League club Igman Konjic.

Honours
Igman Konjic
Second League of FBiH: 2008–09 (South) 

Sarajevo
Bosnian Premier League: 2018–19, 2019–20 
Bosnian Cup: 2018–19, 2020–21

References

External links

1990 births
Living people
People from Konjic 
Bosnia and Herzegovina footballers
First League of the Federation of Bosnia and Herzegovina players 
Premier League of Bosnia and Herzegovina players
FK Igman Konjic players
NK GOŠK Gabela players 
FK Velež Mostar players
FK Sarajevo players
FK Olimpik players 
Association football wingers